Juan José García Martínez (born 16 May 1987), commonly known as Juanjo, is a Spanish footballer who plays for Racing Murcia FC. Mainly a right back, he can also play as a winger.

Club career
Born in Murcia, Sánchez was a Real Murcia youth graduate, and made his debut as a senior with the reserves in 2006, in Tercera División. In August 2010, he was loaned to Segunda División B side Real Jaén for one season.

Juanjo continued to compete in the third level in the following years, representing Lorca Atlético CF, La Roda CF, Gimnàstic de Tarragona, UD Melilla and Cádiz CF. He achieved promotion to Segunda División with the latter team in 2016, appearing in 29 matches (play-offs included).

Garrido made his professional debut on 19 August 2016, coming on as a second-half substitute for Luis Ruiz in a 1–1 away draw against UD Almería. He left the Estadio Ramón de Carranza the following 19 January by mutual consent, and returned to his first club Murcia just hours later.

References

External links

Stats and bio at Cadistas1910 

1987 births
Living people
Footballers from Murcia
Spanish footballers
Association football defenders
Association football wingers
Association football utility players
Segunda División players
Segunda División B players
Tercera División players
Real Murcia Imperial players
Real Jaén footballers
Lorca Atlético CF players
La Roda CF players
Gimnàstic de Tarragona footballers
UD Melilla footballers
Cádiz CF players
Real Murcia players
CF Lorca Deportiva players
CD Badajoz players
CD Guijuelo footballers
Internacional de Madrid players
Racing Murcia FC players